Opel Rally Team was an auto racing team by German car manufacturer Opel. It competed at the World Rally Championship from 1982 to 1990.

Results

References
Opel Rally Results

Opel
World Rally Championship teams
European Rally Championship teams